This is a list of rivers in Costa Rica.

By drainage basin
This list is arranged by drainage basin, with respective tributaries indented under each larger stream's name.

Caribbean Sea

San Juan River
Colorado River (distributary)
Chirripó River
Sarapiquí River
Toro River
Sucio River
San Carlos River
Arenal River
Pocosol River
Lake Nicaragua (Nicaragua)
Frío River
Sabogal River
Celeste River (Buenavista River)
Zapote River
Niño River (Pizote River)
Sapoá River
Suerte River
Tortuguero River
Reventazón River
Parismina River
Jiménez River
Atirro River
Pejibaye River
Orosí River
Pacuare River
Matina River
Chirripó Duchi River (Chirripó Atlañtico River)
Banano River
Estrella River
Sixaola River
Yorkin River
Uren River
Lari River
Coen River
Telire River

Pacific Ocean
Tamarindo River
Nosara River
Tempisque River
Bebedero River
Cañas River
Piedras River
Corobicí River
Tenorio River
Cañas River
Salto River
Liberia River
Colorado River
Abangares River
Lagarto River
Guacimal River
Aranjuez River
Barranca River
Jesús María River
Tárcoles River
Pirris River
Naranjo River
Savegre River
Térraba River
Coto Brus River
General River
Chirripó Pacifico River
Sierpe River
Coto Colorado River
Río Ceibo
Chacuaco River
Claro River (Costa Rica)
Colón River
Conte River
Diamante River (Costa Rica)
Jaba River (Costa Rica)
La Palma River
Limón River (Costa Rica)
Negro River (Costa Rica)
Rincón River
Riyito River (Costa Rica)
Síngrí River
Tigre River (Costa Rica)
Volcán River

See also 
 Water resources management in Costa Rica
 List of rivers of the Americas by coastline

References

 Rand McNally, The New International Atlas, 1993.
 CIA map, 1987.
 Instituto Costarricense de Turismo map, 2007. 
, GEOnet Names Server

Costa Rica
Rivers
Costa Rica